Subverse is a crowdfunded tactical role-playing shoot 'em up hybrid erotic video game developed by FOW Interactive and published by Streembit Ltd
for Microsoft Windows. It was released on Steam in early access on 26 March 2021 and 25 October 2021 on GOG.com.

Gameplay 

Subverse is set in the fictional Prodigium Galaxy in which humans and different species of aliens co-exist under rule by a tyrannical government known as The Imperium. The gameplay mixes visual novel-style storytelling with completion of missions in tactical grid combat and space shooter sections. Much of the game also features adult themes involving explicit sex scenes with non-human characters and players leveling up "waifu loyalty" from female characters to unlock additional sex scenes.

Plot and characters 

Set in a far future in the distant corner of the universe known as the Prodigium Galaxy, mostly ruled by the theocratic government known as The Imperium in which ideology values virginity over sex. Prodigium makes up of five nebulae: the Dragon Nebula (home of The Imperium); the Hydra Nebula (home to the Kloi race); the Kraken nebula (home to the Nikith and Vanneran race); the Yeti Nebula (home to the Teelee race); and the Griffin Nebula where a colony named Nü Vegas was established on a planet by stranded humans (referred to as the Solar race) of a prison convoy with no way to return to Earth. The main protagonist features a Solar known as The Captain, a former resident of Nü Vegas and the newly self-proclaimed owner of Mary Celeste, a spaceship he found mysteriously drifting across the galaxy without any of its original crew left. As the story progresses, The Captain joins an underground movement along with his new harem of female crewmembers to topple The Imperium rule over Prodigium.

Development and release 

Subverse is the debut commercial video game of FOW Interactive, a video game studio of the computer-animated pornography company Studio FOW. Crowdfunding for Subverse on Kickstarter has raised over £1.6 million within one month of as of May 24, 2019, making the game one of the top twenty highest-funded Kickstarter games to date. The first Act was released on Steam March 26, 2021. For Germany, South Korea, China and all of the other geographic areas who are not permitted to download Subverse from Steam, the company set up the website streemster.com where customers can download the game.

Reception 
On the weekend immediately following its release, Subverse has reached the #2 ranking on the Steam sales charts, behind Valheim.

References

External links 
 
 Subverse at Kickstarter

Early access video games
Erotic video games
Kickstarter-funded video games
Role-playing video games
Science fiction video games
Shoot 'em ups
Single-player video games
Parody video games
Video games about extraterrestrial life
Video games developed in the United States
Video games featuring female protagonists
Windows games
Windows-only games
Upcoming video games